An independent ATM deployer (IAD) is a non-financial institution that owns, manages, and places ATMs (cash machines) in retail premises or elsewhere. IADs emerged in the 1990s in the USA while working alongside depository institutions, such as banks or building societies, to allow people to access cash.

See also
 ATM Industry Association (ATMIA)

References

Banking infrastructure
Payment systems